A gubernatorial election was held on 11 April 1971 to elect the Governor of Saga Prefecture. Incumbent Sunao Ikeda scored a second victory over communist candidate Kōzō Eguchi.

Candidates
 - incumbent Governor of Saga Prefecture, age 69
 - candidate in the 1967 Saga gubernational election and three-time House of Councillors candidate, age 62

Results

References

Saga gubernatorial elections
1971 elections in Japan